Claudia Plakolm (born 10 December 1994) is an Austrian politician of the People's Party (ÖVP) and State Secretary in the federal government of Nehammer. She was sworn in as a member of the National Council on 9 November 2017. Since 15 May 2021 she has been the federal chairman of the Young People's Party (JVP).

Life
Born in Linz, Plakolm was the third of four siblings and grew up in Walding. Her father is the local ÖVP mayor Johann Plakolm. After attending elementary school and the school center of the Kreuzschwestern Linz, where she was head of the school in 2011/12 and graduated from high school in 2013, she first began studying economics at the Vienna University of Economics and Business, and has been studying business education at the University of Linz since October 2014.

Politics

Beginnings
In the school year 2012/13, she was the Upper Austrian state school spokesperson for the AHS area, and in 2013/14, she acted as state chairwoman of the ÖVP-related Union of Higher Students (UHS). Since February 2015, she has been the deputy district chairwoman of the Young ÖVP in the Urfahr-Umgebung District. In October 2016, she was elected regional chairwoman of the Young ÖVP Upper Austria, in April 2019, she was re-elected for three years. Since the municipal council and mayoral elections in Upper Austria in 2015, she has represented the ÖVP in the municipal council of Walding, and since 2016 she has also been part of the state party executive of the ÖVP Upper Austria.

National Council
On 9 November 2017, at the age of 22, she was the youngest member of the XXVI. Legislative period for the Austrian National Council promised. In the course of the formation of the federal government shortly after the National Council election, she negotiated on the ÖVP side in the Family and Youth Section. At the Bundestag of the Young People's Party on 25 November 2017, she was elected Deputy Federal Chairman. In the ÖVP parliamentary club, she acts as a youth spokesperson.

In the 2019 National Council election, she ran behind ÖVP top candidate August Wöginger in second place in the list in the Upper Austria electoral district. Plakolm was re-elected to the committee, but in the XXVII. Legislative period, she is no longer its youngest member. Yannick Shetty of NEOS now holds this status. As part of the coalition negotiations for the formation of a government in 2019, she negotiates in the main group Social Security, New Justice and Poverty Reduction.

In June 2020, she was designated as the successor to Stefan Schnöll as federal chairwoman of the young ÖVP. On 15 May 2021 she was elected with 94.39 percent of the vote for successor of Schnöll.

State Secretary
On 6 December 2021 she was sworn in as a member of the Nehammer Federal Government as State Secretary for Youth and Generations in the Federal Chancellery. Her National Council mandate went to Andrea Holzner.

References

Members of the National Council (Austria)
21st-century Austrian politicians
Austrian People's Party politicians
1994 births
Living people